The Video Show (a.k.a. The Cinema Show: A Video Anthology) is a DVD by British band Genesis. Released on 29 November 2004 in the UK and 13 September 2005 in North America, it compiles music videos from their earliest, three videos filmed for the A Trick of the Tail album in 1976, to their latest, the video for "The Carpet Crawlers 1999", filmed in 1999. Similar to the Platinum Collection compilation album, which was released on the same day, the track listing begins at the We Can't Dance album and goes backwards in time before jumping to post-We Can't Dance material, which appears at the end of the track listing going forwards in time.

While the DVD's packaging says "The Video Show", the introduction to the DVD menu says "The Cinema Show: A Video Anthology", indicating that the name was changed after the DVD was finalised.

All the tracks have had their audio replaced with the new 5.1 Surround Sound and Stereo Remixes featured in the SACD/DVD re-releases. 
Because of this, some of the videos are missing their original sound effects heard during songs like "Land of Confusion" and "I Can't Dance". "Man on the Corner" was originally a live recorded video while the DVD dubs the footage with the studio track.

Track listing
 "No Son of Mine" (We Can't Dance, 1991)
 Directed by Jim Yukich, 1991
 "I Can't Dance" (We Can't Dance, 1991)
 Directed by Jim Yukich, 1991
 "Hold on My Heart" (We Can't Dance, 1991)
 Directed by Jim Yukich, 1992
 "Jesus He Knows Me" (We Can't Dance, 1991)
 Directed by Jim Yukich, 1992
 "Tell Me Why" (We Can't Dance, 1991)
 Directed by Jim Yukich, 1993
 "Invisible Touch" (Invisible Touch, 1986)
 Directed by Jim Yukich, 1986
 "Throwing It All Away" (Invisible Touch, 1986)
 Directed by Jim Yukich, 1986
 "Land of Confusion" (Invisible Touch, 1986)
 Directed by Jim Yukich and John Lloyd, 1986
 "Tonight, Tonight, Tonight" (Invisible Touch, 1986)
 Directed by Jim Yukich, 1987
 "Anything She Does" (Invisible Touch, 1986)
 Directed by Jim Yukich, 1987
 "In Too Deep" (Invisible Touch, 1986)
 Directed by Jim Yukich, 1986
 "That's All" (Genesis, 1983)
 Directed by Jim Yukich, 1983
 "Mama" (Genesis, 1983)
 Directed by Stuart Orme, 1983
 "Illegal Alien" (Genesis, 1983)
 Directed by Stuart Orme, 1983
 "Home by the Sea/Second Home by the Sea" (Genesis, 1983)
 Directed by Jim Yukich, 1983
 "Paperlate" (3×3, 1982)
 From Top of the Pops, 1982  
 "Abacab" (Abacab, 1981)
 Directed by B. Rymer, 1981
 "Keep It Dark" (Abacab, 1981)
 Directed by Stuart Orme, 1981
 "No Reply at All" (Abacab, 1981)
 Directed by Stuart Orme, 1981
 "Man on the Corner" (Abacab, 1981)
 Directed by Stuart Orme, 1981
 "Turn It On Again" (Duke, 1980)
 Directed by Stuart Orme, 1980
 "Duchess" (Duke, 1980)
 Directed by Stuart Orme, 1980
 "Misunderstanding" (Duke, 1980)
 Directed by Stuart Orme, 1980
 "Follow You Follow Me" (...And Then There Were Three..., 1978)
 Directed by B. Rymer, 1978
 "Many Too Many" (...And Then There Were Three..., 1978)
 Directed by Ken O'Neill, 1978
 "A Trick of the Tail" (A Trick of the Tail, 1976)
 Directed by Bruce Gowers, 1976
 "Ripples" (A Trick of the Tail, 1976)
 Directed by Bruce Gowers, 1976
 "Robbery, Assault and Battery" (A Trick of the Tail, 1976)
 Directed by Bruce Gowers, 1976
 "Congo" (Calling All Stations, 1997)
 Directed by Howard Greenhaigh, 1997
 "Shipwrecked" (Calling All Stations, 1997)
 Directed by Greg Masuak, 1997
 "Not About Us" (Calling All Stations, 1997)
 Directed by Mike Kaufman, 1998
 "The Carpet Crawlers 1999" (The Lamb Lies Down on Broadway, 1974; re-recorded for Turn It On Again: The Hits, 1999)
 Directed by Tom Baxandall, 1999

Certifications

References

Genesis (band) video albums
2005 video albums
Music video compilation albums
2005 compilation albums
Virgin Records compilation albums
Virgin Records video albums